Waterdeep is a fictional city in the Forgotten Realms campaign setting for the Dungeons & Dragons role-playing game.

Waterdeep may also refer to:
Waterdeep (band), a Christian band
Waterdeep (module), a D&D game adventure taking place within the fictional city
Waterdeep (novel), a D&D novel in the Avatar Series
City of Splendors: Waterdeep, a supplement to the D&D game

See also
Lords of Waterdeep, a board game set in the fictional city
 Deepwater (disambiguation)